Gazzarri's was a nightclub on the Sunset Strip in West Hollywood, California, United States. The Doors and Van Halen were featured house bands there before being signed to major record labels. It was the backdrop for Huey Lewis and the News' short form promotional music video for their 1984 hit The Heart of Rock and Roll.

History
Gazzarri's reached its peak of popularity in the late 1960s, featuring Jim Morrison's young new group, along with other talent such as ? and the Mysterians, The Bobby Fuller Four, Buffalo Springfield and The Walker Brothers. It also featured actor Edward James Olmos, with his band Eddie James and the Pacific Ocean as the house band in 1966.  It then achieved major L.A. relevance again in the late 1970s, featuring the David Lee Roth-led Van Halen nightly for months on end, and then into the 1980s through the early 1990s as one of the top L.A. glam metal nightclubs. It was owned and operated by Bill Gazzarri, who was known for dressing up as a Chicago-style gangster and frequenting the club on performance nights. Located near the corner of Doheny and Sunset Boulevard in West Hollywood, and just several dozen yards from both the Rainbow Bar and Grill and The Roxy Theatre, Gazzarri's became famous as a launching pad for future rock and roll stars.

Along with the Roxy Theatre, the Whisky a Go Go, the Troubadour, the Starwood and other nearby nightclubs, Gazzarri's was a staple of the Los Angeles music scene from the 1960s into the early 1990s. Some other bands that played at Gazzarri's either prior to or during their mainstream success include Johnny Rivers, Van Halen,  ? and the Mysterians, The Go-Go's, Tina Turner, NEWHAVEN, Southgang, Sonny and Cher, Ratt, Cinderella, Chicano rock band Renegade, punk band X, Victor Flamingo, Quiet Riot, Stryper, Mötley Crüe, Poison, Guns N' Roses, Warrant, and Faster Pussycat. Other notable local Los Angeles area bands to play there included Redd Kross, Brunette, Shark Island, and Hurricane (band). Some of the bands to play Gazzarri's were featured in The Decline of Western Civilization Part II: The Metal Years, such as Salute, Shocktop and Broken Cherry. Many giant hand-painted pictures of these bands adorned the side of the club's outside wall for many years.  Actress-singer Mamie Van Doren even did her 1985 comeback show there.

The 90-yard stretch of sidewalk on Sunset Boulevard that runs from the front steps of Gazzarri's (now 1 Oak, 9039 West Sunset Blvd.) to the parking lot between the Rainbow Bar and Grill (9015 West Sunset Blvd.) and the Roxy Theatre (9009 West Sunset Blvd.) was the national center of the 1980s glam metal movement that spawned dozens of MTV bands and radio hits. Aspiring bands and musicians from around the world, coming to Los Angeles to make it big, eventually found themselves on this street passing out their flyers, watching the competition in the clubs or enjoying the scene packed with thousands of other musicians, famous rock stars, porn stars, groupies and Los Angeles teenagers.

The nightclub also moonlighted variously over the years a stage-dance venue, and Gazzarri's would often feature the strip-club style dancing of attractive, young girls between live band performances. The "Miss Gazzarri's Dancers" included future Playboy Playmate and Hugh Hefner girlfriend Barbi Benton as well as future television star Catherine Bach. The club became a favorite hangout for teen dancers who loved live music, which was not lost on the neighboring television studios. Gazzarri's was acknowledged by TV executives as the real-life inspiration for music-based TV shows such as Don Kirshner's Rock Concert, The Monkees and The Partridge Family.

Gazzarri's was also featured in the 1974 pilot of The Rockford Files and was the location for the Crazy Horse West strip club in the 1976 film The Killing of a Chinese Bookie.

Pay-to-play
The club was part of the controversial "pay-to-play" concept in the 1980s, along with other major Hollywood nightclubs that showcased bands with original songs. As many as four bands per night would each buy 100 to 200 tickets from the club at around $5, handing over in advance hundreds of dollars to the owner for a 45-minute slot on the famous stage. Soon, many bands were spending as much time promoting, handing out flyers, advertising in local magazines and building mailing lists as they were on songwriting, practicing and actually gigging live. Young, hungry bands such as Poison, Mötley Crüe, Van Halen and Guns N' Roses became early masters of self-promotion as a result, developing street-smart business skills that would serve them even as world-renowned superstars. Axl Rose stated several times in interviews that the "L.A. scene was so competitive, if half the bands in the Top 40 right now had tried to get their big break in L.A. instead of somewhere else, they never would have made it."

After
Bill Gazzarri died in 1991 and the club closed down in 1993. In 1994, the building suffered irreparable damage from the Northridge earthquake. It was torn down in 1995 and a new club called Billboard Live opened at the former Gazzarri's site in 1996. Billboard Live became The Key Club in 1998. The Key Club held its final show on March 14, 2013  and was replaced by the nightclub 1 Oak later that year which is still operating the space today.

Live at the Key Club
 Phil Seymour In Concert! (1980, released 2014), Phil Seymour
 Live at the Key Club (Cinderella album) (1998), Cinderella
 The Sting: Live at the Key Club L.A. (2000), W.A.S.P. (band) 
 Live @ the Key Club (2000), Pennywise

References

 "Slash: It Seems Excessive...Doesn't Mean It Didn't Happen"; Slash with Anthony Bozza, 2008 Harper Entertainment Publishing
 "Crazy From The Heat"; David Lee Roth, copyright 1986 Hyperion Books, New York, New York
 The Decline of Western Civilization II: The Metal Years; film includes an interview with club owner Bill Gazzarri.
 Featured in Season 1, Episode 2 of The Rockford Files, "Backlash of the Hunter, Pt. 2" (1974)

External links

 Bill Gazzarri LA Times Obituary 
 Van Halen 1974 Bootleg - Setlist at Gazzarri's 
 LA Times Review of Doors Concert at Gazzarri's
 Press clip of Brunette Rocks at Gazzarri's

Former music venues in California
Music venues in Los Angeles
Nightclubs in Los Angeles County, California
History of Los Angeles
West Hollywood, California
Music venues completed in 1967